The 2021 Mountain Pacific Sports Federation Volleyball Tournament was a postseason men's volleyball tournament for the Mountain Pacific Sports Federation during the 2021 NCAA Division I & II men's volleyball season. It was held April 22 through April 24, 2021 at Smith Fieldhouse in Provo, Utah. Smith Fieldhouse was chosen as the host venue so that family members and a select number of fans may attend the games. That number was later set at 700 per match.  Had the tournament occurred anywhere within California, COVID-19 restrictions would have prevented any attendance. 

The winner received The Federation's automatic bid to the 2021 NCAA Volleyball Tournament.

Seeds
All seven teams are eligible for the postseason, with the #1 seed receiving a bye to the semifinals. Teams are seeded by record within the conference, with a tiebreaker system to seed teams with identical conference records. The #1 seed will play the lowest remaining seed in the semifinals.

Due to the possibility of an unbalanced number of league matches played this year, conference wins (NOT win percentage), will be the first criteria looked at to determine MPSF Tournament seeding. Conference win percentage will be the first tiebreaker.

Schedule and results

Bracket

Game summaries
All times Mountain.

Quarterfinals

Semifinals

MPSF Championship

All-Tournament Team
Gabi Garcia Fernandez-BYU (MVP)
Zach Eschenberg-BYU
Wil Stanley-BYU
Jacob Steele-Pepperdine
Austin Wilmot-Pepperdine
Camden Gianni-Grand Canyon
Cole Ketrzynski-UCLA

References

2021 Mountain Pacific Sports Federation volleyball season
Mountain Pacific Sports Federation Volleyball Tournament